A list of alumni of St Catherine's College, Oxford.

The list includes alumni associated with the Delegacy for Unattached Students, the Delegacy for Non-Collegiate Students and St Catherine's Society prior to the official founding of the college.

R.J.Q. Adams – American historian who specializes in the history of Great Britain
Clive Barnes – theatre critic
Mark Beech – writer and  broadcaster, rock critic
Benazir Bhutto – Pakistani politician, elected to an Honorary Fellowship of the College 1989
Michael Billington – critic, author and radio presenter
John Birt – former Director-General of the BBC
Christopher Bishop – Chief Research Scientist at Microsoft Research, Cambridge, and Chair of Computer Science at the University of Edinburgh
Victor Blank – Chairman of Lloyds TSB
Euros Bowen – Welsh poet
Simon Bridges - Politician, Leader of the Opposition (National Party), New Zealand
Tim Brighouse – education guru, previously Schools Commissioner for London
 Ben Britton, materials scientist and engineer
Hans-Paul Burkner – Chairman of The Boston Consulting Group
Alan Chesters – Anglican Prelate
Christian Cole - first black graduate of the University of Oxford
John Cornforth – 1975 Nobel Laureate in Chemistry
Yannis Stournaras - Governor of the Bank of Greece
Denis Cosgrove – former Alexander von Humboldt Professor of Geography at the University of California, Los Angeles
Alexander Curtis - youngest mayor in the United Kingdom
Barun De – historian; formerly Chairman, West Bengal Heritage Commission
Jeremy Duns – British author
Audrey Elkington – Archdeacon of Bodmin
Clark Kent Ervin – first Inspector General of the US Department of Homeland Security
Alice Eve – actress
Adam Foulds – novelist and poet
Emilia Fox – actress
Timothy Garden, Baron Garden – Liberal Democrat
J. Paul Getty – American mogul and philanthropist
Chris Greening - biochemist and microbiologist
Joseph Heller – American author and playwright; Catch-22
Richard Herring – comedian and writer
Ernest Hilbert – American poet, book critic, opera librettist, and editor
Farooq Leghari – former President of Pakistan
Sam Llewellyn – author
Peter Mandelson – architect of "New Labour", several times a UK Cabinet minister, and Trade Commissioner in the Barroso Commission 2004–2008
Olly Mann – podcaster and broadcaster, co-creator of the podcast Answer Me This!
Carl Marci – American neuroscientist
James Marsh – Academy Award-winning film director
Chris Maslanka – writer and broadcaster
Mark Miodownik – materials scientist, engineer, broadcaster and writer
Hiren Mukherjee – Member of Parliament, Calcutta North East, 1952–77. 
Richard Newby, Baron Newby – Liberal Democrat politician
George Peck – founder of the Oxford School Of Drama
Bob Peirce – diplomat
Seamus Perry - lecturer in English Literature
Tom Phillips – artist and Royal Academician
Alex Polizzi – hotelier and television presenter
Benjamin Ross – film director
David Rudkin – playwright
Gene Sharp – leading theoretician on nonviolent struggle 
Mark Simpson – clarinetist, BBC Young Musician of the Year 2006, and BBC Young Composer of the Year 2006
Paul Spike – author, editor and journalist
Andrew Stewart Coats - cardiologist
H. S. Suhrawardy – First Bengali Prime Minister of Pakistan
John Vane – 1992 Nobel Laureate in Medicine
Rudolf Vleeskruijer – founder of the English Institute of the University of Utrecht
John E. Walker – 1997 Nobel Laureate in Chemistry
Maurice Wiggin - journalist and author
Ben Willbond- actor, star of Horrible Histories, Yonderland and Ghosts 
Eric Williams – Prime Minister of Trinidad and Tobago
Paul Wilmott – British mathematician and quantitative analyst
Simon Winchester – British author and historian; The Surgeon of Crowthorne; The Map that Changed the World
Jeanette Winterson – British author of books including Oranges Are Not the Only Fruit, Sexing the Cherry, Written on the Body, The World and Other Places
Emily Woof – actress
P. C. Wren – novelist, author of Beau Geste
David Yates – current Warden of Robinson College, Cambridge
Helen Zaltzman – podcaster, co-creator of the podcast Answer Me This!
Grant Gee – film director, best known for the documentary Meeting People is Easy
Guthrie Govan - Musician

Sportsmen

Phil de Glanville – former England rugby captain
David Hemery – Olympic gold medallist in athletics
 Christopher Liwski – American rower and 2005 Oxford Blue 
Matthew Pinsent – Quadruple Olympic gold medallist in rowing
 Colin Smith – British rower and three time Oxford Blue
 Andrew Triggs Hodge- British rower, double Olympic gold medallist
Derek Wyatt – rugby international, former MP and founder, Oxford Internet Institute

References

St Catherine's College, Oxford
St Catz